Christian Broadcasting System or CBS is a South Korean religious broadcasting system for Christians.
The station has its own radio and TV.

History
The station started on December 15 of 1954 as a radio station(with the call sign 'HLKY') for the purpose of establishing a civil religious network and became the first civil network in korea.
The broadcasting system was known for its contributions to human rights, democratization of economy, politics against dictatorship from the 1960s to the 1980s. As a result, the broadcasting system was affected by the Policy for Merger and Abolition of the Press. In 1992,The broadcasting system moved its head quarters to from Jongno to Mokdong In 1995, the station opened the radio station CBS music fm In 1998,cbs launched another radio station, cbs pyojun fm. In 2002, cbs tv was launched.
From 2005,cbs tv also transmitted its broadcasting services to american regions

See also
 No Cut News, a daily newspaper owned by the network

References

South Korean radio networks
Broadcasting companies of South Korea